Skynyrd's Innyrds: Their Greatest Hits is a Lynyrd Skynyrd greatest hits album, released in 1989. The tracks were recorded between 1973 and April 1977.

A notable inclusion is the "Outtake Version" of "Free Bird", which, with a longer running time of 10:08, differs from the original 1973 studio recording (from (Pronounced 'Lĕh-'nérd 'Skin-'nérd)) of the song (timed at 9:08) by having a concluding outro instead of a fade-out ending.

The album was certified 5× platinum in July 2001 by the RIAA, making it the band's highest-selling album.

Track listing

Tracks 1–2, 9, 12–13 from Second Helping (1974)
Tracks 3–4, 6 (Faded-Out Version) from (Pronounced 'Lĕh-'nérd 'Skin-'nérd) (1973)
Track 5 (original) from Gimme Back My Bullets (1976)
Track 7 from Legend (1987)
Track 8 from Nuthin' Fancy (1975)
Tracks 10–11 from Street Survivors (1977)
Tracks 5 and 6 (Full Version) are previously unreleased

Certifications

References

1989 greatest hits albums
Lynyrd Skynyrd compilation albums
MCA Records compilation albums